John Francis DeSwan (January 13, 1876 – December 1, 1956) was a private serving in the United States Army during the Spanish–American War who received the Medal of Honor for bravery.

Biography
De Swan was born January 13, 1876, in Philadelphia, Pennsylvania and joined the army from his birth city in May 1893 (claiming to be 21 because he was underage). He was discharged in December of that year, and re-enlisted in January 1896. He was sent to fight in the Spanish–American War with Company H, 21st U.S. Infantry as a private where he received the Medal of Honor for his actions.

He died December 1, 1956, and is buried at Golden Gate National Cemetery in San Bruno, California. His grave can be found in section R, grave 195-A.

Medal of Honor citation
Rank and organization: Private, Company H, 21st U.S. Infantry. Place and date: At Santiago, Cuba, 1 July 1898. Entered service at: Philadelphia, Pa. Birth: Philadelphia, Pa. Date of issue: 22 June 1899

Citation:

Gallantly assisted in the rescue of the wounded from in front of the lines and under heavy fire from the enemy.

See also

 List of Medal of Honor recipients for the Spanish–American War

References

External links
 

1876 births
1956 deaths
United States Army Medal of Honor recipients
United States Army soldiers
American military personnel of the Spanish–American War
Military personnel from Philadelphia
Burials in California
Spanish–American War recipients of the Medal of Honor
Burials at Golden Gate National Cemetery